The Rumakali River is a river in Tanzania. Draining into the Lake Nyasa, the river has a surface area of 693 square kilometers.

Planned hydropower
A hydroelectric dam of 222MW is planned on the Rumakali River.

References

Rivers of Tanzania